Kesidang is a state constituency in Malacca, Malaysia, that has been represented in the Melaka State Legislative Assembly.

The state constituency was first contested in 2004 and is mandated to return a single Assemblyman to the Melaka State Legislative Assembly under the first-past-the-post voting system. , the State Assemblyman for Kesidang is Seah Shoo Chin from the Democratic Action Party (DAP) which is part of the state's opposition coalition, Pakatan Harapan (PH).

Definition 
The Kesidang constituency contains the polling districts of Taman Merdeka, Batu Berendam, Taman Melaka Baru, Malim Jaya, Bertam, Taman Asean, Kampung Padang, Bakar Batu and Limbongan.

Demographics

History

Polling districts
According to the gazette issued on 31 October 2022, the Kesidang constituency has a total of 9 polling districts.

Representation history

Election results

References

Malacca state constituencies